The following is a list of chairmen and presidents of what is now Citigroup—the person or persons who were ultimately responsible for the company since its founding in 1812. The company was led by presidents until 1909, when James J. Stillman became the first chairman, holding the highest office in the company.

Presidents

Chairman

Presidents
The Chairman position was not filled between 1918 (Stillman's death) and 1929. Duties were handled by the President who acted on an interim basis.

Chairmen

References 

Citigroup history. Archived from the original on June 4, 2011.

Citigroup
Citigroup